MACCRAY High School is a public high school located in Clara City, Minnesota, United States.  It is part of the MACCRAY school district, a consolidation between Maynard, Clara City, and Raymond to create one unified school district.

MACCRAY High School was the first school in Minnesota to go to a  four-day school week.  They started the four-day week at the beginning  of the 200809 school year with Mondays off. Their Mascot is the Wolverines. The boys' basketball team finished third in the state tournament during the 201011 basketball season.

References

External links
 MACCRAY School District.

Public high schools in Minnesota
Education in Chippewa County, Minnesota